Ludovic Heathcoat-Amory (11 May 1881 – 25 August 1918) was an English first-class cricketer and soldier.

Early life
Heathcote-Amory was born at Westminster on 11 May 1881. He was a son of Sir John Heathcoat-Amory, 1st Baronet and the former Henrietta Mary Unwin. His brother John and uncle Henry Stanley both played first-class cricket.

He was educated at Eton College, before going up to Christ Church, Oxford.

Cricket career
While studying at Oxford, he played first-class cricket for Oxford University, making his debut against Surrey at Oxford in 1902. He played first-class cricket for Oxford until 1903, making six appearances. He scored a total of 76 runs in his six matches, with a high score of 26. With his right-arm fast bowling, he took 9 wickets at an average of 18.33 and with best figures of 4 for 55. In addition to playing first-class cricket, Heathcoat-Amory also appeared in three minor counties matches for Devon spread between 1902–10.

Career
After graduating from Oxford in 1904, he time touring South Africa, India, Australia and New Zealand with Edward Wood, the future 1st Earl of Halifax. Heathcoat-Amory served in the First World War with the Royal 1st Devon Yeomanry, which was attached to the Royal Artillery. He was made a temporary a lieutenant in December 1914, while in June 1915 he was made a temporary captain and the following year he was made a temporary major. He was promoted to the full rank of lieutenant in June 1917.

Personal life
In July 1911, he married Mary Stuart Bannatyne, a daughter of James Fitzgerald Bannatyne of Haldon House. Before his death in 1918, they had three children. 

 Patrick Gerald Heathcoat-Amory (1912–1942), a barrister who was killed in action, at age 30, in Libya during World War II.
 Michael Ludovic Heathcoat-Amory (1914–1936), who was killed, at age 22, in an airplane accident.
 Edgar Fitzgerald Heathcoat-Amory (1917–1944), who married Sonia Myrtle Denison, daughter of Capt. Edward Conyngham Denison (a grandson of Albert Denison, 1st Baron Londesborough) in 1940; he was killed in action, at age 26, at Normandy, France.

Heathcoat-Amory died of wounds received in action at Bayonvillers in France on 25 August 1918.

Descendants
Through his youngest son Edgar, he was posthumously a grandfather of Michael FitzGerald Heathcoat Amory (who married Arabella ( von Hofmannsthal) von Westenholz, former wife of Baron Piers von Westenholz), and Amanda Mary Heathcoat-Amory (who married Simon Cairns, 6th Earl Cairns).

References

External links

1881 births
1918 deaths
People from Westminster
People educated at Eton College
Alumni of Christ Church, Oxford
English cricketers
Military personnel from London
Oxford University cricketers
Devon cricketers
British Army personnel of World War I
Royal 1st Devon Yeomanry officers
British military personnel killed in World War I
Younger sons of baronets